Roland C. Boudreau (October 19, 1935 – June 14, 2019) was a Canadian politician. He served in the Legislative Assembly of New Brunswick from 1974 to 1978 as member of the Progressive Conservative party from the riding of Nigadoo-Chaleur.

References

1935 births
2019 deaths
Acadian people
Progressive Conservative Party of New Brunswick MLAs
People from Gloucester County, New Brunswick